The tables below list all of the divisors of the numbers 1 to 1000.

A divisor of an integer n is an integer m, for which n/m is again an integer (which is necessarily also a divisor of n). For example, 3 is a divisor of 21, since 21/7 = 3 (and therefore 7 is also a divisor of 21).

If m is a divisor of n then so is −m. The tables below only list positive divisors.

Key to the tables 

 d(n) is the number of positive divisors of n, including 1 and n itself
 σ(n) is the sum of the positive divisors of n, including 1 and n itself
 s(n) is the sum of the proper divisors of n, including 1, but not n itself; that is,  s(n) = σ(n) − n
a deficient number is greater than the sum of its proper divisors; that is, s(n) < n
a perfect number equals the sum of its proper divisors; that is, s(n) = n
an abundant number is lesser than the sum of its proper divisors; that is, s(n) > n
a highly abundant number has a sum of positive divisors greater than any lesser number's sum of positive divisors; that is, s(n) > s(m) for every positive integer m < n. Counterintuitively, the first seven highly abundant numbers are not abundant numbers.
a prime number has only 1 and itself as divisors; that is, d(n) = 2.  Prime numbers are always deficient as s(n)=1.
a composite number has more than just 1 and itself as divisors; that is, d(n) > 2
a highly composite number has more divisors than any lesser number; that is, d(n) > d(m) for every positive integer m < n. Counterintuitively, the first two highly composite numbers are not composite numbers.
a superior highly composite number has more divisors than any other number scaled relative to some positive power of the number itself; that is, there exists some ε such that  for every other positive integer m. Superior highly composite numbers are always highly composite numbers.
a weird number is an abundant number that is not semiperfect; that is, no subset of the proper divisors of n sum to n

1 to 100

101 to 200

201 to 300

301 to 400

401 to 500

501 to 600

601 to 700

701 to 800

801 to 900

901 to 1000

See also

External links
 

Divisor function
Elementary number theory
Divisors
Divisors
Numbers